Super Scrabble is a board game introduced in 2004 and a variant of Scrabble. It is played on a 21×21 grid board instead of Scrabble's usual 15×15, and uses twice as many letter tiles.

In North America Super Scrabble is made and marketed by Winning Moves Games, but licensed by Hasbro. In the rest of the world it is manufactured by Tinderbox Games under license from Mattel. Super Scrabble is available in English and German. In February 2007, a Deluxe Super Scrabble was released with a rotating gameboard and interlocking tiles, just like Deluxe Scrabble.

Gameplay differences
The changes from standard Scrabble in Super Scrabble are summarized by the latter's tagline, "More spaces, more tiles, more points—add to your fun!" The board is larger; (21×21 or 441 squares vs. 15×15 or 225 squares); there are more premium squares (going up to quadruple letter and word score spaces); there are 200 tiles, twice as many as a normal Scrabble set. The middle 15×15 squares are identical to a Scrabble board, so standard Scrabble may be played on a Super Scrabble board. All the high-scoring quadruple premiums lie near the outside of the board, with the quadruple word squares at the four corners of the board.

Other than the differences in the board and the number of tiles, gameplay is similar to Scrabble. Each player has seven tiles in their rack as normal, scoring is the same, and the same word lists are used. However, the differences are enough to upset normal Scrabble strategies. For example, the fifty points earned from a bingo (using all seven tiles) is not nearly as significant when compared to the high final scores. For a two-player game, scores over eight hundred points are not uncommon.

Tournament-level Scrabble games are usually limited to two players. Many tournament players find games with more players cramped. With its larger board, Super Scrabble is ideally suited for three- and four-player games. Indeed, its scoring sheets do not have enough lines to keep score for most two-player games.

Super Scrabble has exactly twice as many tiles as Scrabble, but the distribution of letters is not simply the original distribution doubled. The distribution is:

4 blank tiles (scoring 0 points)
1 point: E ×24, A ×16, O ×15, T ×15, I ×13, N ×13, R ×13, S ×10, L ×7, U ×7
2 points: D ×8, G ×5
3 points: C ×6, M ×6, B ×4, P ×4
4 points: H ×5, F ×4, W ×4, Y ×4, V ×3
5 points: K ×2
8 points: J ×2, X ×2
10 points: Q ×2, Z ×2

The  and  indicate modifications from double the original distribution, with  indicating more than double the original distribution, and  indicating fewer. Note, for example, that there are more than twice as many S's (ten, whereas standard Scrabble has four). This was done to make more opportunities for plurals and third-person singular verbs.

Strategy
Many of the same strategies that are applied in standard Scrabble play can be utilized in this version. Premiums play a larger role in Super Scrabble, due to both the presence of quadruple letter and word scores, and also because near the edge of the board, double word scores are spaced closely together, making it much easier to score a "double-double". In addition, opportunities for bingos are increased due to the three extra squares in each direction. For the same reason, hooks can play a larger part in strategy (a hook is a letter that can be played at the start or end of a word already on the board and as part of the same move in a new word in the cross direction).

Certain high scoring words that are impossible to make in Scrabble without using blanks, such as words with doubled Z's (e.g. FUZZ, JAZZ, DAZZLE), can be played. The word KNICKKNACK, with 4 K's, cannot be played in Scrabble because there is only 1 K and only 2 blanks - but it is possible to play this word in Super Scrabble. The same is true for words with four Z's, such as PIZZAZZ and RAZZMATAZZ. With quadruple-letter scores spaced only three squares away from a double-word score, it is not uncommon to see a single play score over one hundred points, even without a fifty-point bonus. Guarding against such plays becomes vital to strategy. However, due to the larger size of the board, this becomes increasingly difficult, especially late in the game.

External links
, including A Super Scrabble board
 Super Scrabble page, Link to Deluxe Super Scrabble page on Winning Moves USA's website
 Rules, Link to the game's rules on the Winning Moves USA site
 scrabble game

Board games introduced in 2004
Scrabble variants
Winning Moves games